Cyperus leiocaulon is a species of sedge that is native to parts of eastern Australia.

See also 
 List of Cyperus species

References 

leiocaulon
Plants described in 1878
Flora of New South Wales
Flora of Queensland
Taxa named by George Bentham